The 1933–34 Serie A season was the eighth season of the Serie A, the top level of ice hockey in Italy. Hockey Club Milano won the championship by defeating GSD Cortina in the final.

Qualification

Quarterfinals
SG Cortina - HC Diavoli Rossoneri Milano II 1-0
Ortisei - HC Bolzano 1-2
Hockey Club Milano II - GUF Torino 8-1

Semifinals
SG Cortina - HC Bolzano 4-1
HC Diavoli Rossoneri Milano - Hockey Club Milano II 2-0

Final
SG Cortina - HC Diavoli Rossoneri Milano 4-2

Final
Hockey Club Milano - SG Cortina 2-0 on series (2-0, 4-1)

External links
 Season on hockeytime.net

1933–34 in Italian ice hockey
Serie A (ice hockey) seasons
Italy